State Road 472 (SR 472) is an east–west divided highway currently running from U.S. Route 17-92 (US 17/US 92) near DeLand to CR 4145 in Deltona, Florida, United States. With an interchange at Interstate 4 (I-4), SR 472 serves as the primary access to Orlando and Sanford from DeLand. It also provides a direct route to Deltona, terminating at CR 4145 (Howland Boulevard/Graves Avenue).

Route description
SR 472 begins at an interchange with US 17/US 92 in between Orange City and DeLand in Volusia County, heading east as a four-lane divided highway. The road passes through forested areas with some nearby development, curving to the southeast, skirting a corner of DeLand to the northeast The highway crosses CR 4101, at which point at again runs along the southern border of DeLand. SR 472 reaches an interchange with I-4, at which point it enters Deltona. A short distance past this interchange, SR 472 reaches its eastern terminus at an intersection with CR 4145.

Major intersections

References

External links

472
472